The Settlers is a video game series.

There are four games in the series with the same name:

 The Settlers (1993 video game)
 The Settlers DS (2007 video game)
 The Settlers HD (2009 video game)
 The Settlers (2020 video game)